Eddie Elguera (born November 12, 1962, in Bellflower, California) is a 2-time world champion skateboarder and senior pastor of C3 Church, in the Palm Springs area of Southern California. He is also known by the nickname "El Gato". Eddie graduated from Rim of the World High School. He is married to Dawna Elguera and has three sons, Malachi Elguera, Christopher Elguera, and Isaac Elguera. Eddie also has 4 grandchildren.  Elguera and his family currently live in Palm Desert, California.

Skateboard career
Elguera, who was given the nickname "El Gato" (Spanish for "The Cat") early on in his career (in reference to his Mexican American heritage), is known as a legend in the sport and one of the early innovators of vertical skateboarding.

In May 1979, Elguera received the title of U.S. Amateur Skateboard Association Champion. He then went on to the professional circuit and became Skateboarder of the Year (a Skateboarder Magazine readers' poll, but still significant, since the sport was relatively unknown at the time) along with receiving the “Most Spectacular New Maneuver” award for inventing the "Elguerial", a skateboard maneuver named after him.

In 1980, Elguera went on to win the 1980 Gold Cup Series of skateboarding and became the World Champion for the 2nd year in a row. Some of the tricks, which have enabled him to play a major part in skateboarding history, include the Elguerial, the frontside rock-n-roll, the fakie ollie, and the frontside invert, which he perfected. Elguera also performed in the music video "Freedom of Choice" for the new wave band "Devo". However, Elguera soon developed a substance abuse problem that he struggled with for several years.

Eddie, now in his 50s, still competes worldwide and continues to rank in the top 5 of the Masters Division on World Cup Skateboarding. He was indulcted into the Skateboard Hall of fame in 2016. Eddie is considered an innovator, legend and mentor by many in the skateboard industry including Tony Hawk, Steve Caballero, Christian Hosoi and Eric Koston.

Christianity
In 1983, Elguera became a born-again Christian. He joined an “on fire” church and sat under the teaching and discipleship of his “spiritual father” and pastor, Jim Cobrae. Within a three-year period of time, Elguera married his wife Dawna, a girl from his church, and they began a family which now includes three boys. During this time Elguera decided to return to skateboarding.

Since then, Elguera has been skating and telling people the good news about the Lord Jesus Christ, all over the world. “The Lord has blessed me one hundredfold, with a comeback after seven years of having left skating. From success to nothing, and back to success with Jesus, only God could do such a thing”. Elguera has been on Nickelodeon, ESPN, The 700 Club, T.B.N.’s Fire By Night, 100 Huntley Street a Christian program in Canada, and on television programming in various countries around the world. Along with various magazine interviews such as Christianity Today, Breakaway, a Focus on the Family publication, Elguera has skated as part of the Franklin Graham and John Guest Crusades across the U.S. and Youth Alive in Australia.

Over the years Elguera has used skateboarding as a relatively new approach to ministry and a way to motivate kids and get them excited about Jesus. “Through the gift that God has given me, I have the honor of seeing thousands of kids come to Christ, as well as many of the parents!”

In recent years, Eddie and his wife Dawna created and have hosted the El Gato Classic which began as an event that gathers legendary skateboarders and fans from around the world for a weekend that combines art, music, and skateboarding. Eddie's vision for the event is to "Honor the Past and Champion the future. Since its inception, it has grown to include skateboard contests that feature all generations of skateboarders, including a women's event.

References

External links
 Elguera.com
 C3 Church
 Eddie's Twitter
 Eddie's Facebook
 El Gato Classic

1962 births
Living people
American skateboarders
American sportspeople of Mexican descent
Sportspeople from California
People from Bellflower, California
People from Palm Desert, California